Heteronutarsus is a genus of mantises belonging to the family Eremiaphilidae.

The species of this genus are found in Northern Africa.

Species:

Heteronutarsus aegyptiacus 
Heteronutarsus albipennis 
Heteronutarsus arenivagus 
Heteronutarsus zolotarevskyi

References

Eremiaphilidae